Jean Beguin (1550–1620) was an iatrochemist noted for his 1610 Tyrocinium Chymicum (Begin Chemistry) (Digital edition), which many consider to be one of the first chemistry textbooks.  In the 1615 edition of his textbook, Beguin made the first-ever chemical equation or rudimentary reaction diagrams, showing the results of reactions in which there are two or more reagents. Modern rendering of this famous diagram, detailing the reaction of corrosive sublimate (HgCl2) with sulfide of antimony (Sb2S3), is shown below:

See also
Timeline of chemistry

References

External links
Jean Beguin - Eric Weisstein's World of Scientific Biography

1550 births
1620 deaths
17th-century French chemists